This is a list of films which have placed number one at the weekend box office in Poland during 2010.

See also
 List of Polish films — Polish films by year

References

 

2010
2010 in Poland
Poland